Mir Ahmadi (also Romanized as Mīr Aḩmadī and Mīr Ahmad) is a village in Zagheh Rural District, Zagheh District, Khorramabad County, Lorestan Province, Iran. At the 2006 census, its population was 411, in 71 families.

References 

Towns and villages in Khorramabad County